Mainpat is a hill station and small village in the Surguja district in the northern part of the state of Chhattisgarh, India. This hill station is 50 km south of divisional headquarter of Ambikapur, 160 km northeast of Korba, and 360 km northeast of state capital Raipur.

This hill station is famous for the Ulta Pani or Bisar Paani which seems to defy the gravity and flows upward.

Overview 
Mainpat is known as the "Shimla/Swiss of Chhattisgarh" and is a popular tourist attraction. It is also home to a number of Tibetan religious exiles who worship at a temple dedicated to Buddha and manufacture designer mats as well as woolen cloth.

Recently, the village has been developed infrastructure like roads & rest houses for travelers. Here one can easily find a lot of adventurous sports like Trekking, Zorbing Ball, Rapling etc. Fields are covered with yellow and white crops. 

There is a place in a village called Bisar Paani (5 KM before Mainpat on right side of road going from Ambikapur to Mainpat) where water flows upstream. Villagers have made a canal for watering and water flows upward 30 ft on its own. No device and no scientific explanation could be found. The hill station features the Tiger Point Waterfall, Fish Point Waterfall, Ghaghi waterfall, Zalzali(bouncing land), Parpatiya view point and Buddha temples.

History 
1962-63 lot of Tibetans migrated to India. Government of India allotted them the land in Mainpat hill. The Home Ministry gave 3000 acres of land to about 1400 Tibetan immigrants. The village was traditionally home to the Yadavs and tribes including the Manjhi.

Gravity hill 

Ulta Pani, also called Bisar Paani, is the place on this hill which is a gravity hill where due to the optical illusion the water seems to defy the gravity and seems flows from bottom to uphill.

Connectivity

By road 
Nearest bus stand is Ambikapur Bus Terminal from where tourist vehicles can be booked

By Rail 
Nearest Railway station is Ambikapur Railway station

By Air 
Nearest Airport is Ambikapur Airport which is currently under development after which Ambikapur Airport is poised to get Air connectivity to Raipur & Varanasi

See also 
 Tourism in Chhattisgarh

References

External links 

Villages in Surguja district
Hill stations in Chhattisgarh
Gravity hills